The Road Home, a live album released in 1995, is the fourteenth album overall by the rock group Heart. It chronicles a club performance in the "unplugged" style – but with strings – in their home city of Seattle. The setlist contains acoustic versions of many of the band's hits including "Alone", "Barracuda", and "Dreamboat Annie".

The album was produced by John Paul Jones of Led Zeppelin, a band to whom Ann and Nancy Wilson paid tribute with their band the Lovemongers. "He was a prince among men," enthused Ann. The cover photograph shows an old picture of a young Ann & Nancy Wilson with a candle.

The album reached number eighty-seven on the U.S. Billboard 200.

In 1995 a VHS was released under the same name and with the same cover containing another concert from the same tour. The video was reissued on DVD in 2003.

Track listing

VHS track listing
unlisted introduction interview with Ann & Nancy Wilson
"River" 
"Dog and Butterfly" 
"(Up on) Cherry Blossom Road" 
"Back to Avalon"
"Alone" 
"These Dreams" 
"Dreamboat Annie (Fantasy Child)" 
"Seasons" 
"Dream of the Archer" 
"Love Alive"
"All I Wanna Do Is Make Love to You"
"Straight On" 
"Mistral Wind" (A. Wilson, N. Wilson, Ennis, Fisher)
"Barracuda" 
"Love Hurts" 
"Crazy on You" 
"The Road Home"

DVD bonus material
The Road Home - electronic press kit
"Crazy on You" - live from The Tonight Show with Jay Leno
"The Road Home" - live from Later with Greg Kinnear

Personnel
Ann Wilson - lead vocals, guitars, autoharp, flute
Nancy Wilson - vocals, guitars, mandolin
Howard Leese - guitars, mandolin, keyboards, accordion, background vocals
John Paul Jones - piano, bass, mandolin, producer (only on CD concert)
Fernando Saunders - bass, background vocals
Denny Fongheiser - drums, percussion
Gary Gersh - percussion, executive producer
Kristen Barry - background vocals
Seattle Symphony string section (CD):
Gennady Filimonov, Leonid Keylin - violins
Vincent Comer - viola
David Tonkongui - cello
John DeJarnatt - oboe, English horn
London Metropolitan String Quartet on track 12 and DVD:
Rosemary Furniss, David Ogden - violins 
Andrew Brown - viola
Caroline Dale - cello
John Anderson - oboe
Roger Bolton - conductor

Charts

Certifications

References

Heart (band) live albums
1995 live albums
Capitol Records live albums
Albums recorded at the Moore Theatre
1995 video albums
Live video albums
Capitol Records video albums